Christopher Liljewall (born December 27, 1989) is a Swedish professional ice hockey player. He is currently an unrestricted free agent who most recently played with Timrå IK of the Swedish Hockey League (SHL).

Playing career
Liljewall made his Elitserien (now the SHL) debut playing with Rögle BK during the 2008–09 Elitserien season.

Liljewall captained Rögle BK for two seasons before leaving the club at the conclusion of the 2016–17 season, to join finalists Brynäs IF on a two-year contract on May 17, 2017.

References

External links

1989 births
Living people
Swedish ice hockey forwards
Brynäs IF players
Rögle BK players
People from Ängelholm Municipality
Södertälje SK players
Timrå IK players
Växjö Lakers players
Sportspeople from Skåne County